Helicocystis is a stalked, spiralling pentaradial echinoderm known from the Cambrian Jbel Wawrmast Formation.

References

Prehistoric echinoderm genera
Helicoplacoidea